Hazard is an early English game played with two dice; it was mentioned in Geoffrey Chaucer's Canterbury Tales in the 14th century.

Despite its complicated rules, hazard was very popular in the 17th and 18th centuries and was often played for money.  At Crockford's Club in London, hazard was especially popular.  In the 19th century, the game craps developed from hazard through a simplification of the rules. Craps is now popular in North America but neither game remains popular amongst the rest of the world.

Rules
Any number may play, but only one player – the caster – has the dice at any one time.

In each round, the caster specifies a number between 5 and 9 inclusive: this is the main. They then throw two dice.

 If they roll the main, they win (throwing in or nicking).
 If they roll a 2 or a 3, they lose (throwing out or outing).
 If they roll an 11 or 12, the result depends on the main:
 with a main of 5 or 9, they throw out with both an 11 and a 12;
 with a main of 6 or 8, they throw out with an 11 but nick with a 12;
 with a main of 7, they nick with an 11 but throw out with a 12.
 If they neither nick nor throw out, the number thrown is called the chance. They throw the dice again:
 if they roll the chance, they win;
 if they roll the main, they lose (unlike on the first throw);
 if they roll neither, they keep throwing until they roll one or the other, winning with the chance and losing with the main.

This may be simpler to follow in a table:

The caster keeps their roll until losing three times in succession. After the third loss, they must pass the dice to the left, that player becoming the new caster.

Betting
Bets are between the caster and the bank (the setter), which may be the remaining players acting as a group.

If the caster nicks on the first throw, they win an amount equal to their stake. After the first throw, the caster wins their stake if they get their chance before their main.

After the first throw, the caster (and others, via side bets) may wager an additional sum that the chance will come before the main. These bets are made at odds determined by the relative proportions of the main and the chance:

For example, with an odds stake of £10, a main of 7 and a chance of 5, a caster stands to win £15 (3/2 × £10); with the same stake, a main of 5 and a chance of 6, they could win £8 (4/5 × £10).

Probability of winning
For each main the probability of winning can be calculated:

In some reports on the rules of the game, the main is determined randomly by tossing the dice until a valid main appears. In this case, the overall player disadvantage is 1.84%. 

If the caster can choose a main, they should always choose 7 (resulting in the lowest disadvantage, with 1.41%). This is the origin of a similar dice game, craps, since if 7 is always chosen, the game is played under the rules of craps.

Etymology of the name
The name "hazard" is borrowed from Old French. The origin of the French word is unclear, but probably derives from Spanish azar ("an unfortunate card or dice roll"), with the final -d by analogy with the common French suffix -ard. The Spanish word has been supposed in turn to come from Arabic, either from the name of a castle in Palestine, or from the word az-zahr (الزهر) meaning "dice". However, early evidence for this word in Arabic is lacking, as it is absent from Classical Arabic dictionaries, making the etymology doubtful (although any other source is unknown). Another possibility is Arabic yasara ("he played at dice").

Derivations from Hazard
From the game of Hazard came the modern terms:
Possibly, the phrase "'at sixes and sevens" (another possible derivation is discussed under that article). "Set upon six and seven" first appeared in Chaucer's Tales relating to betting one's entire fortune on a single throw of the dice. Over time the phrase became associated with any circumstances involving general confusion or disorder.
The word "hazard" in its modern sense of "risk" or "danger".
"An eye for (on / to) the main chance": habitually looking for opportunities to take advantage of a situation for personal gain, especially financial gain.
This expression is taken from the use of the terms "main" and "chance" in "Hazard" - a game of gambling with dice, from which "Craps" is derived.

References

Further reading

 William Biggs Boulton (1901). The Amusements of Old London (London: John C. Nimmo), vol. I, pp. 134-49. (Online edition hosted by Archive.org.)
 Steinmetz, Andrew (1870). The Gaming Table, Volume II, Chapter X. (Online edition available at World Wide School.)

Dice games
Gambling games